The 1940 Heywood and Radcliffe by-election was held on 28 August 1940.  The by-election was held due to the death of the incumbent Conservative MP, Richard Porritt. It was won by the Conservative candidate James Wootton-Davies, who was elected unopposed.

References

Heywood and Radcliffe by-election
Heywood and Radcliffe by-election
1940s in Lancashire
Heywood and Radcliffe 1940
Heywood and Radcliffe 1940
Heywood and Radcliffe 1940
Unopposed by-elections to the Parliament of the United Kingdom (need citation)
Heywood and Radcliffe by-election